This is a list of French television related events from 1986.

Events
22 March - Cocktail Chic are selected to represent France at the 1986 Eurovision Song Contest with their song "Européennes". They are selected to be the twenty-ninth French Eurovision entry during a national final.

Television shows

1940s
Le Jour du Seigneur (1949–present)

1950s
Présence protestante (1955-)

1960s
Les Dossiers de l'écran (1967-1991)
Les Animaux du monde (1969-1990)
Alain Decaux raconte (1969-1987)

1970s
30 millions d'amis (1976-2016)
Les Jeux de 20 Heures (1976-1987)

1980s
Julien Fontanes, magistrat (1980-1989)
Mardi Cinéma  (1982-1988)

See also
1986 in France
List of French films of 1986